The Emblem of Shkodër,  known as the Shkodër Coat of Arms  is the city emblem of Shkodër, Albania. The Arms of Shkodra Portrays a golden S to represent the first letter of the name Shkodër, it is accompanied by two eight-pointed white stars with a red rectangle surrounding it, below is a blue background with a white intersecting grid.

History 
The Coat of arms of Shkodër can be traced back to the reign of the Balshaj family with a coin depicting the current arms of Shkodër in (1375-1400).

See also 
Shkodër
Shkodër County

References 

Flags of Albania
Shkodër